Antonio Salvador Sucar (14 June 1939 – 31 December 2018) was a Brazilian basketball player. He was a member of the team that won the title at the 1963 World Championship, in Rio de Janeiro, and the bronze medal at the 1967 FIBA World Championship with the Brazil national basketball team. Sucar participated in three Summer Olympic Games and won two bronze medals in 1960 and 1964.

References

1939 births
2018 deaths
Argentine emigrants to Brazil
Brazilian men's basketball players
1963 FIBA World Championship players
1967 FIBA World Championship players
Basketball players at the 1960 Summer Olympics
Basketball players at the 1964 Summer Olympics
Basketball players at the 1968 Summer Olympics
Esporte Clube Sírio basketball players
Olympic basketball players of Brazil
Olympic medalists in basketball
FIBA World Championship-winning players
Olympic bronze medalists for Brazil
Medalists at the 1960 Summer Olympics
Medalists at the 1964 Summer Olympics